Ernest Meissner (29 May 1937 – 26 September 2008) was a Canadian diver. He competed in two events at the 1960 Summer Olympics.

References

External links
 
 
 

1937 births
2008 deaths
Canadian male divers
Olympic divers of Canada
Divers at the 1960 Summer Olympics
Sportspeople from Belgrade
Commonwealth Games medallists in diving
Commonwealth Games bronze medallists for Canada
Divers at the 1962 British Empire and Commonwealth Games
Medallists at the 1962 British Empire and Commonwealth Games